Judgment Deferred is a 1952 British drama film directed by John Baxter and starring Joan Collins, Hugh Sinclair, Helen Shingler and Abraham Sofaer. The film is a remake of the director's earlier film, Doss House (1933).

Production
The film was shot at Southall Studios with sets designed by the art director Don Russell. It was the first production from Group 3 Films, a company formed to encourage new young British film-makers (which later produced The Brave Don't Cry, Conflict of Wings, The Angel Who Pawned Her Harp and several other low-budget features).

Plot
With the assistance of a journalist a group of refugees and down and outs try and unmask the criminal who has framed one of their number as a drug dealer.

Selected cast
 Hugh Sinclair as David Kennedy 
 Helen Shingler as Kay Kennedy 
 Abraham Sofaer as Chancellor 
 Leslie Dwyer as Flowers 
 Joan Collins as Lil Carter 
 Harry Locke as Bert 
 Elwyn Brook-Jones as Coxon 
 Marcel Poncin as Stranger 
 Martin Benson as Pierre Desportes
 Bud Flannagan as Himself
 Bransby Williams as Dad
 Michael Martin Harvey as Martin
 Harry Welchman as Doc  
 Wilfred Walter as Judge
 Maire O'Neill as Mrs. O'Halloran
 Mary Merrall as Lady Musterby  
 Edgar Driver as Blackie  
 Billy Russell as Ginger
 Sam Kydd as Ambulance Driver

Critical reception
The Radio Times described the film as "a muddled, maudlin melodrama that feels like substandard Frank Capra done by amateur theatricals." TV Guide found the film "captivating mainly because of the novelty of the story and the many strange characters that are introduced." Sky Movies wrote "this one occasionally creaks under the strain of its longish running time but offers some striking tableaux, especially within the weird 'court' held by a crowd of criminals, eccentrics and jobless that in some ways recalls the 'jury' that proved the nemesis of Peter Lorre in Fritz Lang's classic thriller 'M'."

References

Bibliography
 Chibnall, Steve & McFarlane, Brian. The British 'B' Film. Palgrave MacMillan, 2009.

External links

1952 films
British crime drama films
1952 crime drama films
1950s English-language films
Films directed by John Baxter
Films set in London
Films shot at Southall Studios
Remakes of British films
British black-and-white films
1950s British films